James Frazer Dow (27 March 1889 - 1972) was an English professional footballer who played as a defender for Huddersfield Town and Carlisle United. He was born in Sunderland.

References

1889 births
English footballers
English Football League players
Footballers from Sunderland
Association football defenders
Huddersfield Town A.F.C. players
Carlisle United F.C. players
1972 deaths